A number of units of measurement were used in Switzerland to measure length, mass, etc. Metric system was optional in 1868, and has been compulsory since 1877.

System before metric system

Units were varied and were not in fixed values.  During the transition to the metric system, units were fixed.  Before 1856, almost every canton had its own system of units.

Length

A number of units were used to measure length.  One pied (1 fuss) was equal to 0.30 m, according to the fixed value defined during the transition to the metric system.  Some other units and their fixed values are given below:

1  ligne = 1/144 pied

1 linie = 1/144 pied

1 pouce = 1/12 pied

1 zoll = 1/12 pied

1 aune = 2 pied (or 4 pied)

1 elle = 2 pied

1 brache = 2 pied

1 toise = 6 pied

1 ruthe = 6 pied

1 perche = 16 pied (or 10 pied)

1 lieue = 16 000 pied.
Lieue was used as a road measure.

Area

One arpent was 400 pied2 or 1.44 ha

Mass

A number of units were used to measure mass.

Ordinary

One livre (pfund of the Zollverein) was equal to 0.500 kg according to the fixed value defined during the transition to the metric system. Some other units and their fixed values are given below:

1 loth = 1/32 livre

1 once = 1/16 livre

1 quintal = 100 livre.

Medicine (apothecary or pharmacy)

One livre was equal to 0.375 kg according to the fixed value defined during the transition to the metric system. Some other units and their fixed values are given below:

1 grain = 1/5760 livre

1 scruple = 1/288 livre

1 drachme = 1/96 livre

1 once = 1/12 livre.

Capacity

Two main systems, dry and liquid, were used.

Dry

Several units were used to measure dry capacity.  Some units are given below:

1 quarteron (divided into 1/4 and 1/16) = 10  emine =  15 L (0.4257 bushel)

1 double quarteron = 2 quarteron

1 sac = 10 quarteron.

Quarteron is the volume of 30 livre of pure water at 4° Celsius.  Quarteron was equal to 5/9 of a cubic pied.

Liquid

Several units were used to measure dry capacity.  Some units are given below:

1 sctier = 25 pot

1 muid = 4 setiers

1 pot = 1.5 L (1.585 quarts).
Pot was the bulk of 3 livres weight of pure water at the temperature of 4° Celsius. Pot was equal to 1/18 pied3 and was subdivided into 1/2, 1/4 and 1/8.

References

Swiss culture
Switzerland